As of December 2012, there were 12 correctional facilities in Armenia. Armenian prisons are overcrowded. In total of 12 facilities designed for 4,391 people, there were 4,697 prisoners in February 2012, up by more than 400 compared to June 2009, when 4,294 prisoners were held in these facilities.

New prison in Armavir
A new prison is currently under construction in the city Armavir, not far from capital Yerevan. It was scheduled to be completed in fall 2013. The opening of the prison in Armavir will allow the authorities to lose the Nubarashen prison. $20 million will be spent on its construction.

References

Prisons in Armenia